"Unfold" is a song by American record producer Porter Robinson and British singer-songwriter and producer Orlando Higginbottom, known professionally as Totally Enormous Extinct Dinosaurs. It is the sixth and final single from Robinson's second album Nurture, released on April 22, 2021, one day before the rest of the album. This song is the only listed collaboration on Nurture and Robinson has stated that this was a contributing factor in making the song a callback to his first album Worlds.

Background and composition
Being a longtime admirer of Higginbottom's music, Robinson decided to collaborate with him for a song on Nurture. During the writing process, Higginbottom expressed his appreciation for "Sea of Voices", a song from Robinson's previous album, Worlds. This led Robinson to write the instrumentation in a similar style to his older music, while still retaining some distinctive elements of his newer works. Most prominently among the distinctive sounds of Nurture is Robinson's own singing voice – sometimes processed to sound more feminine – alongside Higginbottom's vocals. As a result of "Unfold" now talking on a more maximalist tone, Robinson made the decision to move it towards the conclusion of the record, as he felt it to be "an end-of-album moment."

The song is set in B♭ major at 133 BPM.

Critical reception
Pitchforks Colin Joyce labeled "Unfold" as "blissed-out digital shoegaze", whilst Sophie Walker of The Line of Best Fit wrote that the track "[felt] somewhat anticlimactic thirteen tracks deep [into Nurture]."

Calling it "soaring, cheery, and blissful", Magnetic Mags Ryan Middleton stated that "Unfold" was the album's "crown jewel". Middleton favorably compared it to Robinson's two previous collaborations, "Easy" (with Mat Zo) and "Shelter" (with Madeon).

Triple J writer Sose Fuamoli thought "the team up [of Robinson and Higginbottom] [had given] way to punching beats, emphatic drum patterns and vocals that only grow stronger with their persistent energy."

Lyric video
The lyric video for "Unfold" was released on YouTube on May 19, 2021. The video was made by Eric Ko with creative direction by Robinson and Samuel Burgess-Johnson, who has collaborated with Robinson on other music videos. The video prominently features the lyrics alongside the chords, similar to a lead sheet, and the beginning of the video features fretboard diagrams for the guitar chords preceded by the words "chords (capo on 3rd fret)".

Charts

Notes

References

External links
 

2021 singles
2021 songs
Porter Robinson songs
Mom + Pop Music singles
Song recordings produced by Porter Robinson
Songs written by Porter Robinson
Songs written by Totally Enormous Extinct Dinosaurs
Totally Enormous Extinct Dinosaurs songs